Rajamangala University of Technology, (RMUT), is one of the university systems in Thailand. It has nine universities providing undergraduate and graduate level education. It was elevated to university status in 2005. Before that it was known as Rajamangala Institute of Technology.

In September 2016, Prime Minister Prayut Chan-o-cha invoked Section 44 of the interim charter allowing him to form a special panel to take over administration of Rajamangala University of Technology Tawan-ok as it was judged to be incapable of administering itself.

Branches
The following is the list of state-run universities in Rajamangala University of Technology system. Most of them have several campuses.
 Rajamangala University of Technology Thanyaburi
 RMUT (Khlong 6)
 RMUT  Thanyaburi Pathumthani Campus
 Rajamangala University of Technology Suvarnabhumi
 RMUT Suvarnabhumi Nonthaburi Campus
 RMUT  Suvarnabhumi Phra Nakhon Si Ayutthaya Hantra Campus
 RMUT  Suvarnabhumi Phra Nakhon Si Ayutthaya Wasukri Campus
 RMUT  Suvarnabhumi Suphanburi Campus
  Rajamangala University of Technology Krung Thep
 RMUT  Krung Thep Bangkok Technical Campus
 RMUT  Krung Thep Bophit Phimuk Mahamek Campus
 RMUT  Krung Thep Phra Nakhon Tai Campus
  Rajamangala University of Technology Rattanakosin
 RMUT  Rattanakosin Salaya Campus
 RMUT  Rattanakosin Bophit Phimuk Chakkrawat Campus
 RMUT  Rattanakosin Pohchang Campus
 RMUT  Rattanakosin Wangklaikangwon Campus (near Hua Hin District)
  Rajamangala University of Technology Phra Nakhon
 RMUT  Phra Nakhon Thewet Campus
 RMUT  Phra Nakhon Chotiwet Campus
 RMUT  Phra Nakhon Bangkok Commerce Campus
 RMUT  Phra Nakhon Chumphonkhet Udomsak Campus
 RMUT  Phra Nakhon North Bangkok Campus
  Rajamangala University of Technology Tawan-ok
 RMUT  Tawan-ok Chakrabongse Bhuvanarth Campus
 RMUT  Tawan-ok Uthenthawai Campus
 RMUT  Tawan-ok Bangphra Campus
 RMUT  Tawan-ok Faculty of Agriculture at Bangphra
 RMUT  Tawan-ok Chanthaburi Campus
  Rajamangala University of Technology Lanna
 RMUT  Lanna Northern Campus
 RMUT  Lanna Chiang Rai Campus
 RMUT  Lanna Tak Campus
 RMUT  Lanna Phitsanulok Campus
 RMUT  Lanna Nan Campus
 RMUT  Lanna Lampang Campus
 RMUT  Lanna Lampang Agricultural Research and Training Center
  Rajamangala University of Technology Isan
 RMUT  Isan Nakhon Ratchasima Campus
 RMUT  Isan Khon Kaen Campus
 RMUT  Isan Kalasin Campus (since 2016 combined to Kalasin University)
 RMUT  Isan Surin Campus
 RMUT  Isan Sakon Nakhon Campus
 RMUT  Isan Roi Et establishing campus
 RMUT  Isan Sakon Nakhon Agricultural Research and Training Center
  Rajamangala University of Technology Srivijaya
 RMUT  Srivijaya Songkhla Campus
 RMUT  Srivijaya Nakhon Si Thammarat Campus
 RMUT  Srivijaya Faculty of Agriculture Nakhon Si Thammarat
 RMUT  Srivijaya Trang Campus

References

Universities in Thailand
Education in Bangkok